Daniel Menzel (born 13 September 1991) is a former Australian rules footballer who played for the Geelong Cats and Sydney Swans in the Australian Football League (AFL). Brother to fellow former footballer Troy Menzel.

AFL career
Originally from Golden Grove, South Australia, Menzel attended King's Baptist Grammar School and played junior football for the Golden Grove Football Club, before his debut for the Central District Football Club in the SANFL, as well as representing South Australia in the 2009 AFL National Under 18 Championships, prior to being drafted by the Geelong Football Club with their first selection, and the 17th overall draft pick, in the 2009 AFL Draft.

Playing for Geelong's VFL team for the majority of 2010, Menzel was awarded the Damien Drum Medal for a best-on-ground performance against Werribee. His AFL-level debut came in Round 20 of the 2010 AFL season in Geelong's 101-point win against the Western Bulldogs, with Menzel scoring a goal. In his follow-up match in the next round, Menzel scored three goals from three kicks, with Geelong defeating Carlton.

As a result of a four-goal performance against St Kilda in round 13 of the 2011 AFL season, Menzel received that round's nomination for the 2011 AFL Rising Star award. After performing well during the 2011 season, Menzel quickly become a crowd favourite with the Geelong supporters, drawing comparisons with star forward Steve Johnson.

In the first round of finals in 2011, Menzel ruptured his anterior cruciate ligament in his right knee. He had a knee reconstruction, and returned to VFL football in June 2012, but ruptured the ACL in his left knee in his return game, ruling him out for the rest of the season. He re-injured the knee in offseason training in December 2012, and opted to undergo LARS reconstruction surgery, in which the natural ligament is augmented with a synthetic ligament. He returned to VFL football in April 2013, but re-injured the LARS-reconstructed ligament in his second match, requiring another reconstruction which ruled him out of playing for the rest of 2013. Menzel is believed to be the first AFL footballer to undergo four knee reconstructions in his career. (* Please note Lee Walker of West Coast and Collingwood had four knee reconstructions during his 16 game career spanning 1993-1997). After 3 seasons lost to knee reconstructions, Menzel returned late in 2015 season and scored 4 goals against Collingwood.

Menzel had a good season in 2017, playing 17 games in the home and away season and kicking 38 goals before being surprisingly dropped from the team in the first match of the finals. He is out of contract at the end of 2017.

In November 2018, Menzel joined the Sydney Swans as a delisted free agent. He was delisted by the Swans at the conclusion of the 2019 season.

Daniel and his brother Troy joined the Woodville West Torrens Eagles in 2021 and together were instrumental in the Eagles winning their first ever back to back SANFL premierships. Daniel topped the Eagles goal kicking list with 44 goals from 18 games (equal with Tyson Stengle), booting 10 goals in 3 finals, including 4 goals in the Grand Final.

Statistics
Statistics are correct to Round 23, 2019 season.

|- style="background-color: #EAEAEA"
! scope="row" style="text-align:center" | 2010
|style="text-align:center;"|
| 10 || 3 || 4 || 1 || 17 || 11 || 28 || 10 || 4 || 1.3 || 0.3 || 5.7 || 3.7 || 9.3 || 3.3 || 1.3
|-
! scope="row" style="text-align:center" | 2011
|style="text-align:center;"|
| 10 || 18 || 28 || 15 || 153 || 68 || 221 || 82 || 31 || 1.6 || 0.8 || 8.5 || 3.8 || 12.3 || 4.6 || 1.7
|- style="background-color: #EAEAEA"
! scope="row" style="text-align:center" | 2012
|style="text-align:center;"|
| 10 || 0 || — || — || — || — || — || — || — || — || — || — || — || — || — || —
|-
! scope="row" style="text-align:center" | 2013
|style="text-align:center;"|
| 10 || 0 || — || — || — || — || — || — || — || — || — || — || — || — || — || —
|- style="background-color: #EAEAEA"
! scope="row" style="text-align:center" | 2014
|style="text-align:center;"|
| 10 || 0 || — || — || — || — || — || — || — || — || — || — || — || — || — || —
|-
! scope="row" style="text-align:center" | 2015
|style="text-align:center;"|
| 10 || 2 || 4 || 2 || 13 || 12 || 25 || 6 || 2 || 2.0 || 1.0 || 6.5 || 6.0 || 12.5 || 3.0 || 1.0
|- style="background-color: #EAEAEA"
! scope="row" style="text-align:center" | 2016
|style="text-align:center;"|
| 10 || 17 || 32 || 24 || 152 || 105 || 257 || 86 || 34 || 1.9 || 1.4 || 8.9 || 6.2 || 15.1 || 5.1 || 2.0
|- style="background-color: #EAEAEA"
! scope="row" style="text-align:center" | 2017
|style="text-align:center;"|
| 10 || 19 || 40 || 16 || 161 || 68 || 229 || 82 || 26 || 2.1 || 0.8 || 8.5 || 3.6 || 12.1 || 4.3 || 1.4
|- style="background-color: #EAEAEA"
! scope="row" style="text-align:center" | 2018
|style="text-align:center;"|
| 10 || 13 || 27 || 15 || 100 || 41 || 141 || 51 || 14 || 2.1 || 1.2 || 7.7 || 3.2 || 10.9 || 3.9 || 1.1
|- style="background-color: #EAEAEA"
! scope="row" style="text-align:center" | 2019
|style="text-align:center;"|
| 2 || 7 || 7 || 8 || 47 || 22 || 69 || 27 || 9 || 1.0 || 1.1 || 6.7 || 3.1 || 9.9 || 3.9 || 1.3
|- style="background-color: #EAEAEA"
|- class="sortbottom"
! colspan=3| Career
! 80
! 143
! 81
! 648
! 333
! 981
! 347
! 120
! 1.8
! 1.0
! 8.1
! 4.2
! 12.3
! 4.3
! 1.5
|}

References

External links

Geelong Football Club players
Living people
1991 births
Australian rules footballers from South Australia
Sydney Swans players
Central District Football Club players